Vaudigny is a commune in the Meurthe-et-Moselle department in north-eastern France.

Geography
The river Madon flows through the commune.

History
In 1987, the communes of Vaudigny and Ormes-et-Ville were created from the commune Les Mesnils-sur-Madon, which took the name Crantenoy.

See also
Communes of the Meurthe-et-Moselle department

References

Communes of Meurthe-et-Moselle